Rodero is a comune (municipality) located on the Swiss border about  northwest of Milan and about  west of Como in the Province of Como, Lombardy, Italy.

Rodero borders the following municipalities: Bizzarone, Cagno, Cantello, Stabio (Switzerland), Valmorea.

Lanza is the name of the main stream that flows in Rodero.

References

External links
 Official website

Cities and towns in Lombardy